Mohammed Kabiru Jibril (18 May 1958 – 19 September 2017) was a Nigerian senator who was elected under the People's Democratic Party (PDP) to represent the Kaduna Central Senatorial District of Kaduna State in April 2007.

Background

Mohammed Kabiru Jibril was born on 18 May 1958. He has an LL.B from Ahmadu Bello University -1984, Nigerian Law School-1985. 
Prior to his election to the senate, he was the National Legal Advisor and National Secretary, North-West Zone for the Peoples Democratic Party (PDP).

Senate career

Mohammed Kabiru Jibril was elected to the National Senate for the Kaduna Central constituency in 2007 and was appointed to committees on Solid Minerals, Security & Intelligence, Police Affairs, Interior Affairs, Gas and Air Force.

In May 2009, Emmanuel Egboga, special adviser on petroleum to President Umaru Yar'Adua alleged that  some senators and labor union leaders may have been bribed on a trip to Ghana to frustrate effort to reform the oil and gas sector . The senate directed its ethics committee to hold a public hearing to investigate the allegation. Senators named by Egboga included Mohammed Kabiru Jibril but was later found clean.

In July 2009 the Nigerian Senate unanimously passed a bill to establish the National Climate Change Commission, sponsored by Senator  Jibril.
Other bills that Kabiru Jabril sponsored or co-sponsored include National Inland Waterways Authority, Nigeria Police Equipment Commission (Amendment), Legal Practitioners Act (Amendment) 2009, Police Act (Repeal and Re-enactment) 2009, Prison Service Act Repeal and Re-enactment 2009 and Criminal Justice Act (Amendment).

Death
He died on 19 September 2017 at the age of 59.

References

Living people
People from Kaduna State
1958 births
Peoples Democratic Party members of the Senate (Nigeria)
Ahmadu Bello University alumni
Nigerian Law School alumni
21st-century Nigerian politicians